Villin 1 is a protein that in humans is encoded by the VIL1 gene.

Function

This gene encodes a member of a family of calcium-regulated actin-binding proteins.  This protein represents a dominant part of the brush border cytoskeleton which functions in the capping, severing, and bundling of actin filaments.  Two mRNAs of 2.7 kb and 3.5 kb have been observed; they result from utilization of alternate poly-adenylation signals present in the terminal exon. [provided by RefSeq, Jul 2008].

References

Further reading